Alt.Country Exposed Roots was a 2 disc compilation released in 1999.

Track listing

Disc 1 
 Lucinda Williams - "Passionate Kisses" (Lucinda Williams) - 2:39
 Blue Mountain - "Blue Canoe" (Blue Mountain) - 4:42
 Gillian Welch - "My Morphine" (David Rawlings/Gillian Welch) - 5:50
 Whiskeytown - "Nervous Breakdown" (Greg Ginn) - 2:19
 Golden Smog - "Looking Forward to Seeing You" (Kraig Johnson) - 2:45
 Jimmie Dale Gilmore - "Dallas" (Jimmie Dale Gilmore) - 2:49
 Freakwater - "Picture in My Mind" (Freakwater) - 3:34
 Meat Puppets - "Lost" (Curt Kirkwood) - 3:27
 The Gourds - "I Like Drinking" (Jimmy Smith) - 3:07
 BR5-49 - "Bettie Bettie" (Chuck Mead) - 3:51
 Tangletown - "See Right Through" (Seth Zimmerman) - 4:08
 Cheri Knight - "Black Eyed Susie" (Cheri Knight) - 4:40

Disc 2 
 The Jayhawks - "Waiting for the Sun" (Gary Louris/Mark Olson) - 4:19
 Kelly Willis - "Talk Like That" (Kelly Willis) - 3:10
 Steve Earle - "Guitar Town" (Steve Earle) - 2:34
 Southern Culture on the Skids - "Too Much Pork for Just One Fork" (Rick Miller) - 2:59
 Johnny Cash - "Folsom Prison Blues" (Johnny Cash) - 2:49
 The Handsome Family - "Weightless Again" (Brett Sparks/Rennie Sparks) - 3:40
 Vic Chesnutt - "Gravity of the Situation" (Vic Chesnutt) - 4:09
 The Honeydogs - "Your Blue Door" (Adam Levy) - 3:23
 Alejandro Escovedo - "Baby's Got New Plans" (Alejandro Escovedo)- 4:53
 Marlee MacLeod - "Mata Hari Dress" (Marlee MacLeod) - 3:17
 Lambchop - "The Saturday Option" (Kurt Wagner) - 4:38
 Gram Parsons - "In My Hour of Darkness" (Emmylou Harris/Gram Parsons) - 3:44

References

1999 compilation albums